Year 348 (CCCXLVIII) was a leap year starting on Friday (link will display the full calendar) of the Julian calendar. At the time, it was known as the Year of the Consulship of Philippus and Salia (or, less frequently, year 1101 Ab urbe condita). The denomination 348 for this year has been used since the early medieval period, when the Anno Domini calendar era became the prevalent method in Europe for naming years.

Events 
 By place 

 Europe 
 Wulfila escapes religious persecution by the Gothic chieftain Athanaric, and obtains permission from Constantius II to migrate with his flock of converts to Moesia, and settle near Nicopolis ad Istrum (Bulgaria).

 Asia 
 In Persia, women are enrolled in the army to perform auxiliary services. 
 In India, Samudragupta of the Gupta Empire defeats Rudrasena in battle.

Births 
 Prudentius, Roman Christian poet (d. 413) 
 Shenoute, monk and saint (d. 466)

Deaths 

 May 9 – Pachomius the Great, founder of Christian cenobitic monasticism (b. 292)
 December 12 – Saint Spyridon, Greek-Cypriot Orthodox bishop and saint (b. 270)

Date unknown 
 Murong Huang, Chinese ruler of the Former Yan (b. 297)

References